The following lists events that happened during 1806 in Chile.

Incumbent
Royal Governor of Chile: Luis Muñoz de Guzmán

Events

Births

Deaths

References

 
Years of the 19th century in Chile
Years in the Captaincy General of Chile
1800s in the Captaincy General of Chile
Chile
Chile